MFTA may also refer to Master of Financial Technical Analysis

Mitsubishi Fuso Truck of America, Inc. (MFTA) is a wholly owned subsidiary of Mitsubishi Fuso Truck and Bus Corporation (MFTBC), Kawasaki, Japan, itself a part of Daimler Truck based in Logan Township, New Jersey, United States. MFTA imports and markets Class 3 through Class 5 medium-duty cabover trucks through more than 200 dealer locations in the United States (including Puerto Rico and Guam) and Canada. As of 2019, MFTA imports and markets diesel-powered, gas-powered, and electric trucks. According to the company, more than 100,000 Mitsubishi Fuso standard, 4-wheel-drive and crew cab trucks have been sold in the Canadian and U.S. markets since the company's founding. Applications include beverage, catering, refrigerated and dry cargo delivery, vehicle recovery, towing, pest control, plumbing, light construction and landscaping, overlanding, among others.

Company history
Established in 1985, MFTA signed its first dealer and sold its first truck in the U.S. in 1986. By the end of that year, the company had enlisted 41 dealers and had total retail sales of 89 trucks.

In 1990, the company introduced its FG model 4-wheel-drive cabover into the North American market. The company expanded operations into Canada in 1999, and sold its 60,000th truck in the North American market in 2001. In 2002 MFTA introduced its FE145 Crew Cab model, followed by redesigned FE and FG models in 2004. By 2005, the company had sold 80,000 trucks and added a 5-year powertrain limited warranty covering all of its models.

In September 2009, the company signed its 200th dealer (Washington Auto Carriage, Spokane, WA). Shortly after, with 175 dealers operating in the U.S. and 25 operating in Canada, it signed a new dealership agreement that expanded its reach into Puerto Rico for the first time. On December 30, 2009, the company sold its 100,000th truck in North America to LaVallee's Bakery Distributors, Waltham, MA.

In March 2011, MFTA introduced a new line of Class 3 through Class 5 medium duty commercial trucks to the North American market, designated the Canter FE/FG Series. For the first time, the parent company (MFTBC) applied the name Canter—the model name used throughout the rest of the world—to its line of light medium-duty trucks marketed in the NAFTA region.

MFTA expanded its dealer network again in November 2013, when it signed an agreement with a dealership on the island of Guam.

In March 2014, the company introduced a new Class 3 model, the Fuso Canter FE130, with a gross vehicle weight rating (GVWR) of 13,200 lb., 6% higher than the 12,500 lb. GVWR of the FE125 model it replaced.

Current models
, MFTA offers the following models for sale in the United States, Canada, Puerto Rico and Guam:
Canter FE130 Diesel: Class 3 cabover work truck with GVWR of 13,200 lb.
Canter FE140 Gas: Class 4 cabover work truck with GVWR of 14,500 lb.
Canter FE160 Diesel: Class 4 cabover work truck with GVWR of 15,995 lb.
Canter FE160 Gas: Class 4 cabover work truck with GVWR of 15,995 lb.
Canter FE160CC Diesel: Class 4 cabover work truck with 7-passenger crew cab and GVWR of 15,995 lb.
Canter FE160CC Gas: Class 4 cabover work truck with 7-passenger crew cab and GVWR of 15,995 lb.
Canter FE180 Diesel: Class 5 cabover work truck with GVWR of 17,995 lb.
Canter FE180 Gas: Class 5 cabover work truck with GVWR of 17,995 lb.
Canter FG4X4 Diesel: Class 4 4-wheel-drive cabover work truck with GVWR of 14,050 lb. (discontinued in 2020)
eCanter: Battery electric work truck with GVWR of 15,995 lb.

Engines/transmissions

FE and FG models
Since 2010 or 2012, all Diesel models of the company's Canter FE and FG models use the same basic Fuso 4P10 model 3.0L (183.0 cu.in.) dual overhead cam (DOHC), 4-stroke, water-cooled, turbocharged, intercooled diesel engine with four valves per cylinder. Engine output on all Canter FE/FG Series diesel models, according to the company's published specifications, is 161 HP @ 3500 rpm and 295 lb-ft of torque @ 1600 rpm. 

All models except the Gas engine come standard with a Mitsubishi Fuso DUONIC™ electronic 6-speed Dual clutch transmission (DCT) with overdrive. The Canter FG4X4 also comes standard with on demand four-wheel drive and reduction gear in a heavy-duty transfer case. Emissions control to meet the 2010 EPA standards is provided by Daimler Truck's BlueTec system.

All of the Canter models have a 12,000-mile service interval (oil changes/routine maintenance) as standard.

FK and FM models
Over the previous decade, the company also offered Class 6 and Class 7 medium-duty work trucks. Three models were generally available:

FK200: Class 6 cabover work truck with GVWR of 19,850 lb.
FK260: Class 6 cabover work truck with GVWR of 25,995 lb.
FM330: Class 7 cabover work truck with GVWR of 32,900 lb.

FK and FM model Fusos were powered by a Mitsubishi 6M60 model 7.5L (460 cu.in.) single overhead cam (SOHC) in-line 6-cylinder water-cooled, turbocharged, intercooled diesel engine with four valves per cylinder. Engine output on all FK and FM models is 243 HP @ 2600 rpm and 516 lb.-ft. of torque at 1400 rpm.

All FK and FM models were mated to Allison 5-speed (FK200/FK260) or 6-speed (FM330) electronic overdrive automatic transmissions, as standard. A Mitsubishi 6-speed OD manual transmission was available on the FK260 model; a Mitsubishi 6-speed direct manual transmission was an option on the FK330 model.

Primary competitors
All Mitsubishi Fuso trucks are of the low-cab-over-engine (LCOE) configuration, also known as low-cab-forward (LCF), or simply as cabovers. Consequently, the company's primary competitors in the North American market are other manufacturers/marketers of medium-duty cabover trucks; namely: Isuzu Commercial Truck of America, Inc., a subsidiary of Isuzu Motors and Hino Trucks USA, a subsidiary of Hino Motors. Historically, the company also competed with GMC Medium Duty cabover trucks, but as of July 31, 2009, GM closed the plant that manufactured its medium duty commercial trucks, including its cabover models and announced it was withdrawing from the medium-duty commercial truck market. The same GM plant also manufactured Isuzu class 6 and class 7 models and Isuzu class 3 gasoline-engine cabover models. In the 2010s, GM reintroduced medium duty commercial trucks - examples include the Chevrolet Low Cab Forward, Chevrolet Silverado chassis cab, GMC Savana Cutaway, and GMC Sierra HD chassis cab. Nissan Diesel America was also a competitor in the U.S. 

Secondarily, MFTA competes with makers of conventional medium-duty trucks. Those are: Ford, Freightliner Medium Duty, International Medium Duty, Kenworth Medium Duty, and Peterbilt Medium Duty. As of 2019, Kenworth markets two medium-duty cabover truck models in the U.S., the Kenworth K270 (Class 6) and K370 (Class 7). Peterbilt sells a medium-duty cabover truck model in the U.S. also, the Peterbilt 220.

References

Fuso (company)
Truck manufacturers of the United States
1985 establishments in the United States